Krell Industries Inc., founded by its C.E.O. and chief designer Dan D'Agostino, is one of America's largest manufacturers of high-end audio systems. While most of their acclaim has come from their power amplifiers and CD players (their flagship model being the Master Reference Amplifier with a price of roughly $100,000), they also make preamplifiers, loudspeakers, subwoofers, and Super Audio CD players.

For model years 2014 to 2020, the Acura RLX featured an optional Krell audio system.

References

External links
Krell Industries homepage

Audio amplifier manufacturers
Compact Disc player manufacturers
Companies based in New Haven County, Connecticut
Companies established in 1980
Audio equipment manufacturers of the United States
Loudspeaker manufacturers
Manufacturing companies based in Connecticut
Orange, Connecticut